The Mistral 16 is a Canadian sailing dinghy that was designed as a daysailer and first built in 1980.

The Mistral 16 is a development of the Ian Proctor designed 1959 Wayfarer dinghy and is similar to the CL 16.

Production
The design was built by Canadian Yacht Builders in Canada, starting in 1980, but it is now out of production.

Design
The Mistral 16 is a recreational dinghy, built predominantly of fibreglass. It has a fractional sloop rig, a spooned, slightly raked stem, a plumb transom, a transom-hung rudder controlled by a tiller and a folding centreboard. It displaces .

The boat may be optionally fitted with a small outboard motor for docking and manoeuvring. It was built as both an open boat and with a small cuddy cabin.

Operational history
In a review Michael McGoldrick wrote, "the formula for this boat was simply to add a small cuddy cabin to the standard Mistral 16 open dinghy. Although the cabin seems to stick out a bit in the front of the boat, this formula has produced a good sailing vessel with a relatively roomy cabin for a 16 footer. While its cabin seems to offer a touch more space than other boats in this size range, it's still going to be a tight fit for anyone who plans to overnight inside this boat."

See also
List of sailing boat types

Related development
CL 16
Wayfarer (dinghy)

References

External links

Dinghies
1980s sailboat type designs
Sailboat types built by Canadian Yacht Builders